Velocita may refer to:
 Velocita Wireless, a U.S. wireless-telecommunications service provider
 Treno Alta Velocità, a special purpose entity owned by RFI for the planning and construction of a high-speed rail network in Italy
 Velocità massima (English title: Maximum Velocity), a 2002 Italian drama film directed by Daniele Vicari

See also 

 Velocity (disambiguation)